Arif Budimanta (*15 March 1968) is  the vice chairman of the Indonesian National Economic and Industry Committee, a body that was formed in 2016 to support the success of the President Cabinet in determining the economic and industrial policy. In that capacity he is also the Senior Advisor for Minister of Finance; Lecturer of Graduate Program University of Indonesia (UI); Member of the Royal Economic Society (RES) London; Founder and Senior Advisor Indonesian Center for Sustainable Development (ICSD); Executive Director of The Megawati Institute from 2008 till now.

He was elected as the Member of Indonesian Parliament (DPR RI) in 2009-2014. Arif Budimanta obtained his PhD from University of Indonesia, then studied Finance in University of Chicago and Leadership for Senior Executive Programme in Harvard Business School (HBS).

He has long experience as a consultant in Mining, Oil, Gas and Development. Prior as expert staff to PT. Timah (Persero) Tbk on sustainable development and corporate social responsibility.

References

Year of birth missing (living people)
Living people
Indonesian business executives
21st-century Indonesian businesspeople
1968 births